Rebecca Marie "Becky" O'Donohue and Jessica Elleanore "Jessie" O'Donohue (born July 13, 1980) are American reality TV show contestants, models and actresses. Becky was a semi-finalist in the fifth season of American Idol. They are identical twins. They appeared in a Guthy-Renker infomercial for Wen Hair Care products for red hair.

Life and career
They are from Dobbs Ferry, New York. Becky and Jessie, who come from a family of Irish and Greek descent, graduated in 2003 from Niagara University.  While at Niagara, the two played on the women's basketball team.  Becky was a member of the Student Athletic Advisory Committee.

Becky's original audition on American Idol was in Boston where she was supported by Jessie (who did not sing due to recent throat surgery). Judge Simon Cowell praised her looks, but said no to her voice. However, she was let through to Hollywood by co-judges Randy Jackson and Paula Abdul. O'Donohue made it through to the final twenty-four contestants in the semi-finals, but was the first female to be eliminated from the show when she received the fewest votes on February 23's results show. They briefly appeared on the American Idol season finale on May 24, 2006, via satellite from Birmingham, Alabama, as commentators during Taylor Hicks' cheering rally.

Both appeared in a special "Twins" episode on Fear Factor where they were eliminated on the first stunt.
The twins also appeared together in Maxim magazine in 2004.
They played twin sisters Darla and Donna in the 2007 comedy film I Now Pronounce You Chuck and Larry and Layna and Sophia on an episode of ER.

Jessie appeared as a stripper named Karamel Owens in an 8th season episode of CSI: Miami titled "Dude, Where's My Groom?", while Becky played a stripper also named Karamel on the House, MD 5th season episode "House Divided."

The twins appeared on the "Sister Act" episode of Minute to Win It, on which they won with $50,000. Becky guest starred in the July 2010 Psych episode "Not Even Close... Encounters", and as Siri in the January 2012 The Big Bang Theory episode "The Beta Test Initiation". They also appear on the infomercial for WEN hair products with red hair. They appeared in Mardi Gras: Spring Break in 2011.

Becky appeared in the 4th season of The Mentalist playing Sasha a fashion model in the episode "Red Is the New Black".

Niagara statistics

Source

References

External links
 
 
 The actress who brought Siri to life

1980 births
American women's basketball players
American female models
American Idol participants
American people of Greek descent
American people of Irish descent
Basketball players from New York (state)

Identical twins
Living people
People from Dobbs Ferry, New York
American twins
21st-century American women singers
21st-century American singers